Tongxinling station, is a station of Line 3 and Line 6 of the Shenzhen Metro. Line 3 platforms opened on 28 June 2011 and Line 6 platforms opened on 18 August 2020.

Station layout

Exits

References

Shenzhen Metro stations
Railway stations in Guangdong
Futian District
Railway stations in China opened in 2011